Sharon Elizabeth Hugueny (February 29, 1944 – July 3, 1996) was an American actress who had a brief film and television career during the 1960s, appearing in 19 TV episodes and four feature films. The last gave her a co-starring role alongside Peter Fonda in 1964 as one of the title characters in The Young Lovers. Other than a single TV guest shot, she had been away from the cameras for nearly a decade, when an attempted return to filmmaking was cut short by a crippling automobile accident in 1977.

Early years
A native of Los Angeles, Hugueny, born on February 29, 1944, became interested in the arts, particularly acting, in her early teens. She took language and ballet classes, had written a play at age 14, and a year later, in 1959, was attending San Fernando Valley State College as a student in drama. Having co-starred in a staging of Madge Miller's Land of the Dragon, she was seen in Blue Denim, James Leo Herlihy's play about teen pregnancy, by Solly Baiano, the head of Warner Bros. talent department. With her parents' permission, Baiano arranged a meeting with producer-director Delmer Daves, then in the midst of preparing Parrish, a big-budget vehicle for Troy Donahue.  She made her film debut in Parrish.

Warner Bros. contractee
Hugueny was enrolled in the Warner Bros. school to continue her education and immediately was put to work, appearing over the next two years in 12 installments of six Warner series as well as playing supporting roles in two features. During this period, her career was sidelined by a brief marriage to Warners contractee Robert Evans and a move with him to New York City. 

Her TV acting debut came on May 4, 1960, a little over two months after the contract signing, in the episode "Shadow of the Blade", broadcast near the end of the first season of the detective series Hawaiian Eye, which gave her top billing among the guest cast. Her second appearance was May 24, as Indian maiden Running Deer in "Attack", an episode of the Western, Colt .45. In June and July, she was on location in the tobacco fields of Connecticut, in Hartford, and at the submarine base in New London, Connecticut, alongside the cast and crew of Parrish, with filming completed on July 24.

On October 14, she was seen in "The Wide Screen Caper" episode of 77 Sunset Strip, playing an up-and-coming starlet named Sprite Simpson, and a month later, portrayed Native American girl Chantay", the title character in the November 13 segment of the western series Lawman. Her last 1960 TV appearance was as Irish lass Deidre Fogarty whose sympathies lay with "The Bold Fenian Men", the December 18 episode of Maverick. At about the same time, a brief news item publicized that "[S]ixteen-year-old Sharon Hugueny who makes her film debut with Troy Donahue in Warners' "Parrish," has already written her autobiography—a by-line piece which will be published in the January issue of the General Motors Corporation magazine.

In 1961, Hugueny appeared in another four episodes and a major feature film, then divorced Evans in November and returned to Hollywood.

Her first series episode, "A Touch of Velvet", was broadcast January 11, in the middle of Hawaiian Eye'''s second season, as she portrayed blind girl Ellie Collins, who helps one of the show's detectives catch a killer, exonerating a suspect whom she marries at the end. On March 3, she was in the "Tiger by the Tail" installment of 77 Sunset Strip, playing Sari, the daughter of a visiting Middle Eastern prince. Her last 1961 episodes, April 16 and 23, were in a two-part story on Maverick, "The Devil's Necklace", cast her as Indian girl Tawny, who falls in love with Bart Maverick.

Role in Parrish

Hugueny was seventh-billed in Parrish, a May 1961 release starring  Karl Malden as a tobacco farm tycoon. She played Paige, his daughter, who competes for and wins the heart of Troy Donahue's title character against Connie Stevens and Diane McBain. The three young actresses were described as co-stars in the film's publicity releases. The film, budgeted at $1,500,000, was a hit, bringing in $4,200,000 in U.S. rentals alone, but the critics were dismissive; Bosley Crowther of The New York Times wrote: "Sharon Hugueny as the farmer's daughter who grows up to be sublimely marriageable...in the slick fiction tradition" and criticizing the film as "synthetic" and "artificial" and of its characters that "[N]ot one of them is representative of credible humanity".

Marriage to Robert Evans
In his 1994 autobiography The Kid Stays in the Picture, then actor and future producer Robert Evans describes how he met Hugueny on the set of Parrish where "she was Warner Brothers' entry as the next Elizabeth Taylor".  According to Evans she was "being protected as if she were the Hope diamond" and "so pure I felt guilty kissing her". In May 1961, Evans asked her to marry him, hoping, as he recounts in the autobiography, that his mother, who was dying of cancer, would see him as potentially becoming, aged nearly 31, a responsible family man. Hugueny, however, was barely three months past her 17th birthday and "[T]his beautiful, genteel innocent not only was a virgin when I married her, but had never been on a date". The May wedding took place "on the grounds of a romantic carriage house on La Colina in Beverly Hills. All my family were there, along with a host of friends—Cary Grant, Elizabeth Taylor and Eddie Fisher, Natalie and R.J., Felicia and Jack Lemmon, Anne and Kirk Douglas, and more".

Shortly after the wedding, Evans decided to give up his acting career and returned to New York so that he could be near his mother and to help manage the women's fashion house Evan-Picone. Referring to Hugueny as "my child bride", he recounts a panic attack she suffered on Manhattan's Lexington Avenue and her call to his office from a phone booth, "[C]hildlike, 'I don't know where I am'." He writes "What had I been thinking, bringing this child to New York? It was like setting a Persian cat loose in the Amazon." Describing her as a "fragile flower", he explained that he "couldn't stand by and watch her be hurt anymore. It was unfair to her. Listening like a child, she understood." A "quickie divorce" in Mexico ended the marriage in November, but it would not be until June 1964 that the final property settlement was signed, and until July, when the divorce became final on the grounds that Evans "was never home".

Return to Hollywood
Back in Hollywood shortly before her 18th birthday, Hugueny was photographed attending Bob Ender's twist party with Richard Chamberlain, but found that leaving for New York and putting her contract with Warner Bros. on hold, had damaged her career prospects. A prominent supporting role in the two-hour, 36-minute Technicolor film version of Leonard Spigelgass' hit Broadway comedy-drama, A Majority of One, which she had been completing at the time of her departure, was edited to little more than a cameo, with eighth billing in the cast list. After three more guest-starring roles in Warner shows, filmed in the first months of 1962, Hugueny's time with the studio was done. A news item noted that she was taking driving lessons, instead of having no other choice but to live within a walking distance of the studio entrance.

The first of her 1962 shows was a third appearance on 77 Sunset Strip, in the episode "Twice Dead", which cast her as the daughter of Margaret Hayes and did not provide her character with a love interest. Two months later, her third appearance on Hawaiian Eye, in the episode "Rx Cricket", which focused on Connie Stevens' title character, left Hugueny competing for attention among a number of other guest stars. Finally, the pilot for The Gallant Men, directed in March by Robert Altman and broadcast on October 5, after her departure from the studio, gave her a couple of brief atmospheric scenes as Rosa.

Freelancing after Warner Bros.
Now at liberty, she received two additional job offers that year, a guest shot on the "Operation Arrivederci" episode of Ensign O'Toole, which spotlighted her as an Italian girl attracted to the title character (played by Dean Jones), and a heavily dramatic part as a mental patient in the independently produced The Caretakers, released on August 21, 1963. In an interview conducted over 40 years later, supporting actor Van Williams recalled the troubled production, produced, directed and co-written by Hall Bartlett and starring Jeffrey Hunter as a progressive doctor at a psychiatric clinic. After running out of funds the production was halted, and the leading man replaced by Robert Stack who put up the financing from his earnings on The Untouchables. In addition to Williams, the cast included another familiar Warner's contractee from Surfside 6 as well as from Parrish, Diane McBain, playing a psychiatric nurse. Billed eighth in the opening credits and eleventh in closing credits, Hugueny was Connie, whose personality is childlike, and who hears imaginary voices and has visions of becoming "free like a daisy". Most of the critical notices did little more than mention the character.

The next time she was seen on-screen occurred on May 20, 1964 in "The Mismatch Maker" episode of The Farmer's Daughter. She played Maria Cortez, the daughter a South American ambassador, who develops a crush on the show's congressman, played by William Windom, with the sensible title character Katie (Inger Stevens), diplomatically resolving the situation by introducing her to another congressman's handsome son (Yale Summers). At the end of the year, with release of her fourth and final feature film, The Young Lovers, she received second billing, after Peter Fonda. Producer Samuel Goldwyn Jr., in his sole outing as a director, conducted a seven-month search to find the appropriate young lead opposite Fonda, with the proviso that in addition to having "training and dedication", she must be "an actress, not a starlet". The highly dramatic story of two unmarried college students, Eddie and Pam, faced with an unplanned and unwanted pregnancy provided numerous opportunities for heated confrontations and provocative (for 1964) contemplation of abortion. A number of critics commended Hugueny on her acting skills, but few had more than tepid words for the film.

Only 20 years old at the time of the film's release, Hugueny was approaching the end of her career. Her only work in 1965 was "This Town for Sale", the November 15 episode of Run for Your Life, and in 1966, as college student Eliza in "The Ten Letterman" episode of Hank. In February, gossip columns reported that she was dating 34-year-old Night of the Iguana actor James "Skip" Ward.

Personal life
Divorced from Robert Evans, 24 year-old Hugueny married 21-year-old freelance photographer Raymond A. Ross in April 1968 in Santa Barbara, California. In December a son was born. The marriage ended in 1974, but sources are unclear whether she was divorced or widowed. Five months into her marriage, she was seen in a one-minute guest shot on the September 18, 1968 episode of Peyton Place, playing Donna Franklin, a glamorous and sophisticated mystery woman. The character did not appear again other than for a fleeting, unbilled, sighting in the December 11 episode. In the last days of 1974, the year of her divorce/widowhood, she made one final appearance in front of the cameras, as a guest star in "Choice of Victims" on Mannix.

Less than two years later, on April 16, 1976, Hugueny, age 32, married Gordon Cornell Layne, 45-year-old writer and founder of Mid America Pictures. The following year, deciding to return to acting, she acquired new management and was en route to sign performing contracts when she was badly injured by a police vehicle engaged in a high-speed pursuit. Attended by her husband at their home in Lake Arrowhead, California, she partially recovered and lived for 19 more years until succumbing to cancer at age 52.

References

External links

Sharon Hugueny at Glamour Girls of the Silver Screen''

1944 births
1996 deaths
Actresses from Los Angeles
American stage actresses
American film actresses
American television actresses
Warner Bros. contract players
Deaths from cancer in California
20th-century American actresses
People from Lake Arrowhead, California
Evans family (Paramount Pictures)